Karawata depressa is a species of flowering plant in the family Bromeliaceae, endemic to Brazil (the state of Bahia). It was first described by Lyman Bradford Smith in 1941 as Aechmea depressa.

References

Bromelioideae
Flora of Brazil
Plants described in 1941